The UFL Championship Game was an American football game held annually to determine the champion of the United Football League.  The game was played annually from the UFL's first season in 2009 until the 2011 season, and involved the first and second place teams in the league's single-division standings playing one week after the conclusion of the UFL's regular season at a pre-determined site.  The winner of the game was awarded the William Hambrecht Trophy, named for the league's founder and majority owner.  The 2012 season of the UFL was cut short when the league ceased operations, and that year's championship game was never played.

Counting the Florida Tuskers and Virginia Destroyers as one franchise, the same two teams played in all three championship games, the Tuskers/Destroyers and the Las Vegas Locomotives.

History
On October 13, 2007, the United Football League announced it would hold its inaugural championship game over Thanksgiving weekend in 2008.  The league had originally used the name "United Bowl" for the contest, but was unable to gain rights from United Indoor Football or its successor, the Indoor Football League, to use the name (the IFL continues to use the United Bowl name).  In March 2008, the league chose Sam Boyd Stadium in Las Vegas, Nevada to host the 2008 title game on the day after Thanksgiving.  When the inaugural season was postponed to 2009, the game was moved to the corresponding date in 2009 and kept in Las Vegas.

The first UFL Championship Game, played on Friday November 27, 2009, involved the Florida Tuskers, who had just finished a perfect 6–0 regular season, against the 2nd place team, the home-standing Las Vegas Locomotives.  The Locos, due to a 33-yard field goal by Graham Gano in overtime, defeated the Tuskers by a 20–17 score.  The game was the UFL's first ever overtime game.

The second UFL Championship Game was held on Saturday November 27, 2010 at Johnny Rosenblatt Stadium in Omaha, Nebraska. The game site was not determined until after October 18, 2010 (after the 5th week of the regular season), with the UFL taking "advance ticket and merchandise sales, energy for all events prior to the season starting, and team record" into consideration for site selection. (After Omaha was selected, the league moved the game date to the Saturday after Thanksgiving to avoid conflicts with the traditional Black Friday Colorado–Nebraska football rivalry game, that year played in Lincoln.)  The game was a rematch of 2009; both the Las Vegas Locomotives and Florida Tuskers finished the regular season with 5–3 records. Las Vegas once again won the title with a three-point margin of victory over Florida, with the final score being 23–20 in favor of Las Vegas.

Prior to the 2010 game, league commissioner Michael Huyghue revealed that the league's season start would move to August beginning in 2011; to accommodate, the 2011 Championship Game was moved up to the weekend of October 21–23.  The move was an effort to capitalize on the labor uncertainty surrounding the 2011 NFL season, an effort that proved futile; the league announced in July 2011 that the season would be moved back to a September to November time frame as it was in 2010, with the UFL Championship Game accordingly moved back to the first week of November.  However, the UFL suddenly called off the balance of its 2011 season on October 17 and moved up the Championship Game to its original weekend—Friday October 21.  The 2011 title game was hosted and won by the Virginia Destroyers, the former Florida Tuskers, who defeated the 2-time defending champion Las Vegas Locomotives, 17–3, thanks to a stifling defense led by game MVP Aaron Rouse, the Destroyers strong safety who recorded 2 interceptions.  Virginia's home stadium, Virginia Beach Sportsplex, was host venue by virtue of the Destroyers' popular following in the Tidewater area, including game attendance (both Destroyer home games attracted crowds above 12,000, while the Locos' lone 2011 home game drew just 6,100).

The 2012 game was cancelled outright, due to extensive financial and attendance shortfalls that forced the league to cease operations four weeks into the season. By regular season record, the Las Vegas Locomotives, who had compiled a perfect season up to that point, would be the champions.

Championship Game results

Appearances by team

Broadcasting
Versus broadcast the first two UFL Championship Games (2009 and 2010), with Doug Flutie handling color commentary for both games and paired with play-by-play announcers Dave Sims (2009) and Craig Minervini (2010).  With the UFL without a national TV partner in 2011, that season's title was carried on a regional basis only through the Destroyers' TV partner, Comcast SportsNet Mid-Atlantic, with Brent Harris on play-by-play and Jerry Glanville on color commentary.

William Hambrecht Trophy
The winner of the UFL Championship Game is awarded William Hambrecht Trophy, which is named in honor of Bill Hambrecht, a co-founder of the UFL, co-owner of the Las Vegas Locomotives, and current UFL commissioner after Michael Huyghue resigned.  The 2009 edition of the trophy was an arcing silver star (resembling the star on the UFL's logo) emerging from an upward arcing base.  A new Hambrecht Trophy was unveiled in 2010; it stands 38 inches in height, is topped by a 3D silver-plated UFL football, and features plaques honoring past and future UFL champions.

References

 
2009 establishments in Nevada
2012 disestablishments in Virginia
Recurring sporting events disestablished in 2012
Recurring sporting events established in 2009